Aleksandra Jadwiga Klejnowska-Krzywanska (born 17 December 1982 in Legnica) is a Polish weightlifter.

Life and career
She was born in 1982 in Legnica. She represented Poland at the 2000 Summer Olympics, ranking fifth in the 58 kg category, with a total of 202.5 kg.

She became world champion in the 58 kg category at the 2001 World Championships, with a total of 215 kg.

On 11 April 2002 Aleksandra Klejnowska and Dominika Misterska failed a drug test carried out in training by the World Anti-Doping Agency. Both appealed, but the IWF Executive Board, decided on 17 November 2002 to suspend them for two years, even though there was evidence from the National Public Prosecutor's Office that the material was not doping.

After the suspension ended, during the 2004 Summer Olympics, she was ranked fifth in the 58 kg category, with a total of 220 kg.

She won a silver medal during the 2005 European Weightlifting Championships, and ranked second in the 58 kg category.

Klejnowska competed in the Women's 58 kg at the 2005 World Championships in Doha, Qatar but finished un-ranked because she missed all of her three snatch attempts.

In 2008, she won the European Championships in the 58 kg category, with a total of 212 kg.

At the 2008 Summer Olympics she ranked 5th in the 58 kg category, with a total of 215 kg.

At the 2012 Summer Olympics she ranked 5th in the 53 kg category, with a total of 196 kg.

She is serving in the Polish Armed Forces (Land branch) as a private first class since 2009.

See also
List of Poles
Poland at the Olympics

Notes and references

External links
 
 
 
 
 

1982 births
Living people
Polish female weightlifters
Olympic weightlifters of Poland
Weightlifters at the 2000 Summer Olympics
Weightlifters at the 2004 Summer Olympics
Weightlifters at the 2008 Summer Olympics
Weightlifters at the 2012 Summer Olympics
People from Legnica
Sportspeople from Lower Silesian Voivodeship
European Weightlifting Championships medalists
World Weightlifting Championships medalists
21st-century Polish women